Loch an Tuirc is a large irregular shaped, shallow loch, located about two miles north-by-north-east of Lochinver in the Assynt district of Sutherland, Highland, Scotland. It is one of three lochs in Scotland with the same name. Loch an Tuirc is located in an area known as the Assynt-Coigach National Scenic Area, one of 40 such areas in Scotland.

Geography
Loch an Tuirc is an area of outstanding natural beauty in area of wilderness landscape of moorland, bogs, and lochs and lochans. To the west is the small Loch Beannach, to the east is Loch Cròcach. The small loch of Loch an Tuir sits to the north. About five miles to the west is the Loch Assynt. 

Water flows from  Loch Cròcach into Loch an Tuirc and is drained out via Allt Loch an Tuirc into Manse Loch in the southwest.

Fishing
Loch an Tuirc and Manse Loch are excellent for fly fishing. Grouse, Claret, Woodcock, Hare-lug and silver butcher are the best fly for the loch.

References

Freshwater lochs of Scotland
Roe Basin

External links
 Angling in Assynt A Guide for Visitors